US Naval Base Marianas was number of United States Navy bases in the Mariana Islands in the Pacific Ocean's Micronesia. Most were built by the US Navy Seabees, Naval Construction Battalions, during World War II. Naval Base Guam was lost to the Empire of Japan during the Battle of Guam in December 1941. Gaum was retaken by United States Armed Forces on July 21, 1944, now also known as Liberation Day. Naval Station Guam was founded on August 7, 1899, after Spain lost the Spanish–American War.

History

On December 10, 1898, Guam was ceded to the United States and the complete island of Guam became a Naval Station.
Naval Advance Base Saipan was built after the Battle of Saipan ended on July 9, 1944. Naval Base Tinian construction started began on August 1, 1944, at the end of the Battle of Tinian. The Marianas Islands Fleet Post Office (FPO) was 3062. Naval Base Tinian had special secret facilities built for the handling of the atomic bombs Little Boy and Fat Man. The bombs were loaded on to the Boeing B-29 Superfortress Enola Gay and Bockscar.  The US Naval built bases for troops, ships, submarines, PT boats, seaplanes, supply depots, training camps, fleet recreation facilities, and ship repair depots. To keep supplies following the bases were supplied by the vast II United States Merchant Navy. After the war ended on VJ Day, all but bases were closed, less Guam, which continued at an US Naval Advance Base.

Major Bases
Major US Naval Bases in the Mariana Islands:
Naval Base Guam, Southern Mariana Island, FPO 926, still active 
Naval Base Saipan, Northern Mariana Islands, FPO  3245 (1944 to 1962)
Naval Base Tinian, Northern Mariana Islands, FPO 3247 (1944-1947)

Minor Bases
Minor World War II US Naval Bases in the Mariana Islands: 
 Naval Base on  Marcus Island, Just North of the Northern Mariana Island, FPO# 3084, airstrip and LORAN station. (1945-1993)
 Naval Base on  Pagan Island, Northern Mariana Island, FPO 3083 (1944-1962)
 Naval Base on  Anatahan Island, Northern Mariana Island, FPO 3041, site of Japanese holdouts 
 Naval Base on  Sarigan Island, Northern Mariana Island, FPO 3046, now nature preserve 
 Naval Base on  Guguan Island, Northern Mariana Island, FPO 3047 
 Naval Base on  Maug Island, Northern Mariana Island, FPO 3077 
 Naval Base on  Rota Island, Northern Mariana Island, FPO 3261 
 Naval Base on  Farallon de Medinilla, Northern Mariana Island, FPO 3036, uninhabited small island 
 Base on Guam: Orote, on the Orote Peninsula, FPO 939 
 Base on Guam: Agana, FPO 943

Naval Airfields
Kagman Field, FPO 958
Marpi Point Field, FPO 959
Kobler Field, FPO 957

Gallery

See also

Seabees in World War II
Battle of the Eastern Solomons
US Naval Advance Bases
Naval Base Marshall Islands
US Naval Base New Guinea
US Naval Base Australia
US Naval Base Solomons
US Naval Base New Zealand

References

External links
Video Saipan Navy Base 1944
Video Saipan 1944 - Piercing Japan's Pacific Defences
Video The Deadly Surprise That Awaited U.S. Troops on Saipan
Video, An Island Called Saipan

Naval Stations of the United States Navy
World War II airfields in the Pacific Ocean Theater
Airfields of the United States Navy
Closed installations of the United States Navy